Ferganoceratodus is a genus of prehistoric lungfish known from the Mesozoic of Asia. It is a basal member of the suborder Ceratodontoidei. Despite only being known from Mesozoic-aged rocks, phylogenetic analyses indicate that it diverged from the rest of the suborder around 300 million years ago, during the late Carboniferous.

Species 
The following species are currently classified in the genus:

 †Ferganoceratodus annekempae Cavin, Deesri & Chanthasit, 2020 (named after Anne Kemp) Phu Kradung Formation, Thailand, Late Jurassic-?earliest Cretaceous
 †Ferganoceratodus jurassicus Nessov and Kaznyshkin, 1985 Balabansai Formation, Kyrgyzstan, Middle Jurassic. 
 †Ferganoceratodus martini Cavin et al., 2007 Phu Kradung Formation, Thailand, Late Jurassic-?earliest Cretaceous
 †Ferganoceratodus szechuanensis (Young, 1942) Huai Hin Lat Formation, Thailand, Late Triassic (Norian) South China, Jurassic, Khlong Min Formation, Thailand, Middle Jurassic, Phu Kradung Formation, Thailand, Late Jurassic-?earliest Cretaceous

References 

Prehistoric lungfish genera
Jurassic bony fish
Cretaceous bony fish
Jurassic fish of Asia
Cretaceous fish of Asia
Taxa named by Varavudh Suteethorn